KKBN (93.5 FM) "The Cabin" has been a radio station since 1986, broadcasting a country music format since March 2000. Licensed to Twain Harte, California, United States, the station serves the greater Mother Lode area comprising Tuolumne and Calaveras Counties with a combined population of approximately 110,000.  The station is currently owned by Clarke Broadcasting Corporation.

References

External links
KKBN-FM's official website
KKBN Information in Media section of myMotherLode.com 

KBN